Kowloon Tong is one of the 25 constituencies in the Kowloon City District in Hong Kong.

The constituency returns one district councillor to the Kowloon City District Council, with an election every four years. The seat has been currently held by Ho Hin-ming of the Liberal Party.

Kowloon Tong constituency is loosely based on Kowloon Tong area with an estimated population of 20,309.

Councillors represented

Election results

2010s

2000s

1990s

References

Kowloon Tong
Constituencies of Hong Kong
Constituencies of Kowloon City District Council
1991 establishments in Hong Kong
Constituencies established in 1991